Robin et Stella was a youth TV show aired on Radio-Québec (now Télé-Québec) from 1989 to 1993 featuring France Chevrette as Robin and Lorraine Auger as Stella.

The main plot was split into stories which lasted three seasons. Robin et Stella was aired three times a week (Mondays, Wednesdays and Fridays).

Television shows filmed in Quebec
1980s Canadian children's television series
Télé-Québec original programming
1990s Canadian children's television series